Jonathan Guillermo Núñez Espinoza (born 25 October 1986) is a Chilean footballer that currently plays for Deportes Copiapó in the Primera B de Chile.

He is nicknamed Mariachi in honour of his father.

Club career
Born in Talca, he began his career at hometown club Rangers. He officially debuted in 2004 aged 18.

In 2007, after the relegation of Rangers to Primera B, he remained at the top tier after being loaned to Palestino, scoring one goal in 29 appearances in his only season season. The following year, he was loaned again, this time to Curicó Unido in the second level, whilst Rangers achieved its promotion to the Campeonato Nacional.

In 2009, he finally returned to Rangers. However, they were relegated in a controversial way after a violation of the league's foreign players rule. He left the club in 2010.

Following spells at Magallanes (2011) and Santiago Morning (2012), Núñez joined Deportes Puerto Montt in January 2013. He helped the southern club win the Segunda División Profesional in the 2013–14 season, returning to the second tier of Chilean football.

Honours

Club
Deportes Puerto Montt
 Segunda División Profesional: 2013–14

References

External links
 
 

1986 births
Living people
Chilean footballers
Curicó Unido footballers
Puerto Montt footballers
Magallanes footballers
Santiago Morning footballers
Rangers de Talca footballers
Deportes Copiapó footballers
Club Deportivo Palestino footballers
Primera B de Chile players
Chilean Primera División players
Segunda División Profesional de Chile players
Association football midfielders
People from Talca